Walt Kyle (born June 11, 1956) is an American ice hockey coach. He is the former head coach of the Northern Michigan Wildcats, a position he held from June 2002 to March 2017.

Career
Kyle started his college career with Boston College, spending two seasons with the program before leaving after the Eagles lost the 1978 title game. He spent a year in the USHL while transferring to Northern Michigan and once he got back into the college ranks he found himself a runner-up for a second time in 1980.

After finishing his eligibility in 1981 Kyle turned to coaching with his alma mater first as a graduate assistant and then a full-time assistant. In the early 1990s Kyle started working as a coach for USA Hockey as both an assistant and head coach for the World Junior Team. While coaching the national program Kyle left his position at Northern Michigan to become a head coach, first for the Seattle Thunderbirds in 1992. Kyle was an assistant coach, under Ron Wilson, for Team USA at the 1994 Men's World Ice Hockey Championships held in Bolzano, Italy. By the late '90s Kyle worked his way up to the NHL as an assistant with both the Mighty Ducks of Anaheim and New York Rangers sandwiched around a short stint with the Hamilton Bulldogs.

In 2002 Rick Comley, the only coach the program at Northern Michigan ever had, left the university. A few months later Walt Kyle returned to Marquette, Michigan to become the second head coach for the team. Kyle's early results with the Wildcats were good, winning 20+ games in each of his first four seasons, but over the course of his 15-year tenure the club slowly declined both in the standings and in relevance. Kyle was never able to win either a conference or tournament title in his time behind the bench and only made one NCAA tournament appearance in 2010.

Towards the end of his time with Northern Michigan Kyle got into trouble off the ice. He was put on administrative leave in January 2015 and just over two years later he was arrested on fraud charges. While prosecutors ultimately dismissed the charges the rumors surrounding the charge contributed to his firing at the end of the 2017 season.

Head coaching record

College

References

External links

1956 births
American ice hockey coaches
American men's ice hockey centers
Anaheim Ducks coaches
Boston College Eagles men's ice hockey players
Ice hockey people from Iowa
Living people
New York Rangers coaches
Northern Michigan Wildcats men's ice hockey players
Northern Michigan Wildcats men's ice hockey coaches
Seattle Thunderbirds coaches
Sportspeople from Waterloo, Iowa
Vancouver Blazers draft picks
Waterloo Black Hawks players